The 2014–15 Louisiana–Lafayette Ragin' Cajuns women's basketball team represented the University of Louisiana at Lafayette during the 2014–15 NCAA Division I women's basketball season. The Ragin' Cajuns were led by third-year head coach Garry Brodhead and played all their home games at the Cajundome with the a select few (mainly during the Women's Basketball Invitational) at the Earl K. Long Gymnasium, which is located on the University of Louisiana at Lafayette campus. They were members in the Sun Belt Conference. They finished the season 23-12, 10–10 in Sun Belt play to finish in sixth place. They advanced to the semifinal game of the Sun Belt women's tournament where they lost to Arkansas State by the score of 61-63. They competed in the Women's Basketball Invitational and went to the championship game, winning by the score of 52-50 against the Siena Saints

Previous season 
The Ragin' Cajuns finished the 2013–14 season 14-16, 7-11 in Sun Belt play to finish in a two-way tie for seventh place in the conference. They made it to the 2014 Sun Belt Conference women's basketball tournament, losing in the first round game by the score of 61-67 to the Western Kentucky Hilltoppers. They were not invited to any other postseason tournament.

Roster

Schedule and results

|-
!colspan=9 style=| Exhibition

|-
!colspan=9 style=| Non-conference regular season

|-
!colspan=9 style=| Sun Belt regular season

|-
!colspan=9 style=| Sun Belt Women's Tournament

|-
!colspan=9 style=| Women's Basketball Invitational

See also
 2014–15 Louisiana–Lafayette Ragin' Cajuns men's basketball team

References

Louisiana Ragin' Cajuns women's basketball seasons
Louisiana-Lafayette
Louisiana-Lafayette
Women's Basketball Invitational championship seasons
Louisiana
Louisiana